The World Telugu Conference (WTC) is a conference for the furtherance of the Telugu language. Literary luminaries attend and share their views on spreading and preserving the language and advocating a Telugu language policy.

History
The first WTC was held in Hyderabad in 1975. The then Minister of Education, Mandali Venkata Krishna Rao, was instrumental in starting it. The singer M. S. Ramarao made his debut at the conference. It was also attended by Sankarambadi Sundarachari, who penned the anthem "Maa Telugu Thalliki", and the actor-singer Tanguturi Suryakumari.

The second WTC was in April 1981 in Kuala Lumpur, Malaysia, and the third in December 1990 in Mauritius.

The fourth Telugu conference was held in Tirupati in December 2012. The fifth was held from 15 December 2017 at LB Stadium, Hyderabad, celebrating 40 years of World Telugu Conferences.

References

External links

 World Telugu Conference: Then and now
 

Telugu language
Language advocacy organizations
1975 in India